Marion Zimmer Bradley's Fantasy Magazine was a quarterly fantasy magazine founded and initially edited by American writer Marion Zimmer Bradley. Fifty issues appeared from summer 1988 through December 2000. It was published by MZB Enterprises from 1988–1989, Marion Zimmer Bradley Ltd. from 1990–1993, and the Marion Zimmer Bradley Living Trust from 1994–2000, all based in Berkeley, California. The Trust continued publication for a short time after Bradley's death in 1999; the magazine went out of business at the end of 2000.

The magazine featured "short, often humorous stories, many by female writers." Interviews with distinguished fantasy authors also appeared in the magazine.

Editors
 Marion Zimmer Bradley, nos. 1-45, summer 1988-fall 1999
 Rachel E. Holmen, January 2000-December 2000

Related anthologies
The Best of Marion Zimmer Bradley's Fantasy Magazine (1994)
The Best of Marion Zimmer Bradley's Fantasy Magazine — Vol. II (1995)

References

 MARION ZIMMER BRADLEY'S FANTASY MAGAZINE, Encyclopedia of Fantasy, 3rd edition.
 Magazines for Libraries, by William A. Katz, Bill Katz, Linda Sternberg Katz, Bowker, 2000, page 3375

Quarterly magazines published in the United States
Defunct science fiction magazines published in the United States
Fantasy fiction magazines
Magazines established in 1988
Magazines disestablished in 2000
Magazines published in California
Mass media in Berkeley, California